, alternatively read as Suchō or Akamitori, was a  after a gap following Hakuchi (650–654) and before another gap lasting until Taihō (701–704). This Shuchō period briefly spanned a period of mere months, June through September 686.

History
The nengō did not survive Emperor Tenmu's death. The era ended with the accession of Temmu's successor, Empress Jitō.

Timeline

The system of Japanese era names was not the same as Imperial reign dates.

Events of the Shuchō era
 686 (Shuchō 1, 9th day of the 9th month): Emperor Tenmu dies
 686 (Shuchō 1, 2nd day of the 10th month): rebellion of Prince Ōtsu discovered; he and conspirators are arrested
 686 (Shuchō 1, 3rd day of the 10th month): Prince Ōtsu commits suicide
 686 (Shuchō 1, 16th day of the 11th month): Princess Ōku, Prince Ōtsu's sister, is removed from position at Ise Shrine
 686 (Shuchō 1, 17th day of the 11th month): earthquake

Notes

References 
 Brown, Delmer M. and Ichirō Ishida, eds. (1979).  Gukanshō: The Future and the Past. Berkeley: University of California Press. ;  OCLC 251325323
 Hioki, Eigō. (2007). . Tōkyō: Kokusho Kankōkai.  ;  OCLC 676118585
 Nussbaum, Louis-Frédéric and Käthe Roth. (2005).  Japan encyclopedia. Cambridge: Harvard University Press. ;  OCLC 58053128
 Titsingh, Isaac. (1834). Nihon Ōdai Ichiran; ou,  Annales des empereurs du Japon.  Paris: Royal Asiatic Society, Oriental Translation Fund of Great Britain and Ireland. OCLC 5850691
 Varley, H. Paul. (1980). A Chronicle of Gods and Sovereigns: Jinnō Shōtōki of Kitabatake Chikafusa. New York: Columbia University Press. ;  OCLC 6042764

External links
 National Diet Library, "The Japanese Calendar" -- historical overview plus illustrative images from library's collection

Japanese eras
686
7th century in Japan